Brian Buckner is an American television writer, mostly known for his work on sit-coms such as Spin City and Friends. He also served as co-executive producer of the HBO vampire series True Blood. Prior to 2005, he frequently worked with writing partner Sebastian Jones.

Television career

Spin City

1.4 Pride and Prejudice
1.12 Criss Cross
1.18 Snowbound
1.24 Mayor Over Miami
2.9 Family Affair: Part 1
2.21 Bye, Bye, Birdies
3.4 The Deer Hunter
3.14 The Nutty Deputy Mayor

Friends

2.21 The One with the Bullies
7.6 The One with the Nap Partners
7.13 The One Where Rosita Dies
7.16 The One with the Truth About London
7.17 The One with the Cheap Wedding Dress
7.22 The One with Chandler's Dad
8.5 The One with Rachel's Date
8.10 The One with Monica's Boots
8.14 The One with the Secret Closet
8.21 The One with the Cooking Class
9.3 The One with the Pediatrician
9.12 The One with Phoebe's Rats
9.17 The One with the Memorial Service
9.18 The One with the Lottery
10.3 The One with Ross's Tan

True Blood

1.04 Escape from Dragon House
1.09 Plaisir d'Amour
2.04 Keep This Party Going
2.06 Hard-Hearted Hannah
3.01 Bad Blood
3.07 Hitting the Ground
4.02 You Smell Like Dinner
4.09 Let's Get Out of Here
5.01 Turn! Turn! Turn!
5.07 In the Beginning
6.09 Life Matters
7.03 Fire in the Hole
7.09 Love Is to Die
7.10 Thank You

Fear the Walking Dead

2.06 Sicut Cervus
2.13 Date of Death

References

External links

 

American television writers
American male television writers
American television producers
Living people
Year of birth missing (living people)